The following are the national records in Olympic weightlifting in Estonia. Records are maintained in each weight class for the snatch lift, clean and jerk lift, and the total for both lifts by the Estonian Weightlifting Federation (ETL).

Senior
Key to tables:

Men

Women

Men U-23

Women U-23

Junior

Men U-20

Women U-20

Youth

Men U-17

Women U-17

Men U-15

Women U-15

Boys U-13

Girls U-13

Historical records

Men (1998–2018)

Women (1998–2018)

References
General
Estonian weightlifting records 3 July 2022 updated
Specific

External links
ETL web site 

Olympic weightlifting
National records in Olympic weightlifting
Olympic records
Olympic weightlifting